Protein & Cell is a monthly peer-reviewed open access journal covering protein and cell biology. It was established in 2010 and is published by Springer Science+Business Media. The editor-in-chief is Zihe Rao (Nankai University). According to the Journal Citation Reports, the journal has a 2018 impact factor of 7.575.

Genetic modification of human embryos controversy 

In 2015, the journal sparked controversy when it published a paper reporting results of an attempt to alter the DNA of non-viable human embryos to correct a mutation that causes beta thalassemia, a lethal heritable disorder. According to the paper's lead author, the paper had previously been rejected by both Nature and Science in part because of ethical concerns; the journals did not comment to reporters.

References

External links

Springer Science+Business Media academic journals
Publications established in 2010
Monthly journals
Molecular and cellular biology journals
Open access journals